Samuel Christopher Bastien Binda (born 26 September 1996) is a professional footballer who plays as a midfielder for EFL Championship club Burnley. Born in Belgium, he represents the DR Congo national team.

Club career
Bastien emerged from R.S.C. Anderlecht's youth system. He made his first team debut on 3 December 2014, in the Belgian Cup against K.R.C. Mechelen, replacing Youri Tielemans after 79 minutes, in a 4–1 home win.

On 31 August 2015, Bastien was loaned to Avellino. He made his debut for the Irpinian team on 12 September 2015 against Modena, replacing Mariano Arini after 53 minutes.

On 26 August 2016, Bastien signed with Serie A side A.C. ChievoVerona, who paid a €2.5 million transfer fee to Anderlecht.

On 14 June 2018, Bastien signed with Standard Liège.

On 5 July 2022, he joined Burnley, newly relegated to the EFL Championship, on a three-year contract.

International career
Born in Belgium, Bastien is of Congolese descent. He was a youth international for Belgium. However, he decided to represent DR Congo national team. He debuted for his home country in a 2–0 2022 FIFA World Cup qualification win over Madagascar on 7 October 2021.

Career statistics

Club

International
.

External links

References

Living people
1996 births
Footballers from Namur (province)
Belgian sportspeople of Democratic Republic of the Congo descent
Democratic Republic of the Congo footballers
Association football midfielders
Democratic Republic of the Congo international footballers
Belgium youth international footballers
Belgium under-21 international footballers
Belgian Pro League players
Serie A players
Serie B players
R.S.C. Anderlecht players
U.S. Avellino 1912 players
A.C. ChievoVerona players
Standard Liège players
Burnley F.C. players
Democratic Republic of the Congo expatriate footballers
Belgian expatriate footballers
Democratic Republic of the Congo expatriate sportspeople in Italy
Belgian expatriate  sportspeople in Italy
Expatriate footballers in Italy
Democratic Republic of the Congo expatriate sportspeople in England
Belgian expatriate  sportspeople in England
Expatriate footballers in England
English Football League players